King station may refer to:

Transportation
King station (Toronto), a subway station in Toronto, Ontario, Canada
King Albert Park MRT station, a rapid transit station in Bukit Timah, Singapore
King Baudouin metro station, a rapid transit station in Brussels, Belgium
King City GO Station, a commuter rail and bus station in King City, Ontario, Canada
King Drive station, an "L" station in Chicago, Illinois, United States
King Edward station, a rapid transit station in Vancouver, British Columbia, Canada
King George station, a rapid transit station in Surrey, British Columbia, Canada
King George Square busway station, a transit station in Brisbane, Australia
King George V DLR station, a light metro station in North Woolwich, East London, England
 King Manor station, a former name for DeKalb Street station, a light rapid transit station in Pennsylvania, United States
King Memorial station, a rapid transit station in Atlanta, Georgia, United States
King William Street tube station, a former Underground station in London, England
King's Circle railway station, a suburban railway station in Mumbai, India
King's Cross station, a complex of three adjacent stations in London, England
Kings Cross railway station, Sydney, a suburban railway station in New South Wales, Australia
King's Lynn railway station, a railway station in King's Lynn, Norfolk, England
2nd and King station, a light rail station in San Francisco, California, United States
Lai King station, a rapid transit station in Kwai Tsing District, Hong Kong
Mackenzie King station, a bus rapid transit station in Ottawa, Ontario, Canada

Other uses
KING-LP, an FM radio station in Lusk, Wyoming, United States
King's Station, a former stagecoach station in San Francisquito Canyon, California, United States
King City weather radar station, is an Environment Canada site in King City, Ontario, Canada
King Salmon Air Force Station, a former United States Air Force radar station near King Salmon, Alaska, United States
King Sejong Station, a Korean research station on the Barton Peninsula, King George Island, Antarctica
Crown King Ranger Station, a ranger station near the top of Crown King Mountain, Arizona, United States
Storm King Ranger Station, a ranger station near Barnes Point, Washington, United States

See also
Martin Luther King station (disambiguation)
King Street station (disambiguation)
King (disambiguation)